The Campeonato Brasileiro Série C 1999, the third level of the Brazilian National Football League, was played from 27 August to 23 December 1999. The competition had 36 clubs and two of them were promoted to Série B.

Fluminense finished the final phase group with most points and was declared 1999 Brazilian Série C champions, claiming the promotion to the 2000 Série B along with São Raimundo, the runners-up. However, with the creation of the Copa João Havelange, Fluminense was promoted directly to the equivalent of the Série A, the Group Blue, while five quarterfinalists (Serra, Náutico, Figueirense, Caxias and Americano), along with Brasil de Pelotas, Villa Nova (reached the second phase), Bangu, Fortaleza, Anapolina and CSA (eliminated in the first phase)  were promoted to the Group Yellow.

Stages of the competition

First phase
Group A

Group B

Group C

Group D

Group E

Group F

Second phase

Quarterfinals

Final stage

Sources
 rsssf.com

Campeonato Brasileiro Série C seasons
1999 in Brazilian football leagues